Kraze United FC are a National Premier Soccer League team based in Orlando, Florida. The Kraze play in the NPSL's Sunshine Conference with five other Florida-based teams. The team roster includes Bitielo Jean Jacques, current Haiti national team defender. 

The name Kraze United FC is inspired by the former name of Orlando City U-23, the Central Florida Kraze.

References

External links
Official site
NPSL official site

National Premier Soccer League teams
Soccer clubs in Orlando, Florida
Association football clubs established in 2015
2015 establishments in Florida